The Mascoian languages, also known as Enlhet–Enenlhet, Lengua–Mascoy, or Chaco languages, are a small, closely related language family of Paraguay.

Languages
The languages are:

Maskoy (Toba-Maskoy)
Enxet (Southern Lengua)
Enlhet (Northern Lengua)
Kaskihá (Guaná)
Sanapaná
Angaité

Two spurious languages have been claimed in the literature, Emok and Maskoy Pidgin.

Jolkesky (2016)
Internal classification by Jolkesky (2016):

(† = extinct)

Lengua-Maskoy
Lengua: Enlhet; Enxet
Maskoy
Maskoy, Southern: Angaite; Sanapana
Maskoy, Northern: Kaskiha; Maskoy

Vocabulary
Loukotka (1968) lists the following basic vocabulary items.

References

Alain Fabre, 2005, Los pueblos del Gran Chaco y sus lenguas, primera parte: los enlhet-enenlhet del Chaco Paraguayo.

 
Mataco–Guaicuru languages
Indigenous languages of the South American Chaco
Languages of Paraguay
Language families
Chaco linguistic area